In Judaism, Nusach ( nusaħ, modern pronunciation nusakh or núsakh), plural nuschaot or Modern Hebrew nusachim, refers to the exact text of a prayer service; sometimes the English word "rite" is used to refer to the same thing. Texts used by different communities include Nosach Teiman, Nusach Ashkenaz, Nusach Sefard, Nusach Edot Hamizrach, and Nusach Ari. In English, the word nusach means formulate, wording. 

Textual nusach is distinct from musical nusach, which refers to the musical style or tradition of a community, particularly the chant used for recitative prayers such as the Amidah.

Meanings
Nusach primarily means "text" or "version", the correct wording of a religious text or liturgy. Thus, the nusach tefillah is the text of the prayers, either generally or in a particular community.

In common use, nusach has come to signify the entire liturgical tradition of the community, including the musical rendition. It is one example of minhag, which includes traditions on Jewish customs of all types.

Varieties

Nusach Ashkenaz

Nusach Ashkenaz is the style of service conducted by Ashkenazi Jews, originating from central and eastern Europe. It is the shortest lengthwise (except for the "Baladi" Yemenite Nusach).

It may be subdivided into the German, or western, branch ("Minhag Ashkenaz"), used in western and central Europe, and the Polish/Lithuanian branch ("Minhag Polin"), used in eastern Europe, the United States and among Ashkenazim, particularly those who identify as "Lithuanian", in Israel.

The form used in the United Kingdom and the Commonwealth (except Canada, which follows the American style), known as "Minhag Anglia"  
is technically a subform of "Minhag Polin" but has many similarities to the German rite. See Singer's Siddur.

Nusach Sefard

Nusach Sefard is the style of service used by some Jews of central and eastern European origins, especially Hasidim, who adopted some Sephardic customs emulating the practice of the Ari's circle of kabbalists, most of whom lived in the Land of Israel. Textually speaking it is based on the Sephardic rite, but in melody and feel it is overwhelmingly Ashkenazi.

Nusach Ari

Nusach Ari means, in a general sense, any prayer rite following the usages of Rabbi Isaac Luria, the AriZal, in the 16th century.

Many Chabad Hasidim refer to their variant of Nusach Sefard as Nusach Ari.

Sephardi and Mizrachi nuschaot

There is not one generally recognized uniform nusach for Sephardi and Mizrahi Jews.  Instead, Sephardim and Mizrahim follow several slightly different but closely related nuschaot.

The nearest approach to a standard text is found in the siddurim printed in Livorno from the 1840s until the early 20th century.  These (and later versions printed in Vienna) were widely used throughout the Sephardic and Mizrahi world.  Another popular variant was the text known as Nusach ha-Hida, named after Chaim Yosef David Azulai.  Both these versions were particularly influential in Greece, Iran, Turkey and North Africa.  However, most communities also had unwritten customs which they would observe, rather than following the printed siddurim exactly: it is easy, from the printed materials, to get the impression that usage in the Ottoman Empire around 1900 was more uniform than it really was.

Other variants include:
the customs of the Spanish and Portuguese Jews, based on an older form of the Castilian rite, with some influence from the customs both of Italian Jews and of Northern Morocco.  This version is distinguished by the near-absence of Kabbalistic elements.
Nusah Adot Hamizrah, originating among Iraqi Jews but now popular in many other communities.  These are based on the opinions of Yosef Hayyim and have a strong Kabbalistic flavour.
Minhag Aram Soba, as used by Syrian Musta'arabi Jews in earlier centuries (the current Syrian rite is closely based on the Livorno prints).
the Moroccan rite, also related to the text of the Livorno prints but with a strong local flavour.  This subdivides into the customs of the Spanish-speaking northern strip and the Arabic-speaking interior of the country.
formerly, there were variants from different parts of Spain and Portugal, perpetuated in particular synagogues in Thessaloniki and elsewhere, e.g. the Lisbon and Catalan rites, and some North African rites appear to reflect Catalan as well as Castilian influence.

Under the influence of the former Sephardi Chief Rabbi, Rabbi Ovadia Yosef, many Israeli Sephardim have adopted a nusach based largely on the Nusach Edot Hamizrach but omitting some of the Kabbalistic additions.

Nosach Teman

A "Temani" nosach was the standard among the Jews of Yemen. This is divided into the Baladi (purely Yemenite) and Shami (adopted from Sephardic siddurim) versions. Both rites are recited using the unique Yemenite pronunciation of Hebrew, which Yemenite Jews, and some scholars, regard as the most authentic, and most closely related to the Hebrew of Ancient Israel.

The Baladi rite is very close to that codified by Maimonides in his Mishneh Torah. One form of it is used by the Dor Daim, who attempt to safeguard the older Baladi tradition of Yemenite Jewish observance. This version used by dardaim was originally used by all Yemenite Jews near the time of Maimonides.

Nussach Eretz Yisrael
In the period of the Geonim, Jews in Israel followed the Nussach Eretz Yisrael which is based upon the Talmud Yerushalmi (Jerusalem Talmud), while the Jewish diaspora followed the customs of Babylonian Jewry. 

The modern Nusach Eretz Yisrael is a recent attempt by Rabbi David Bar-Hayim at reconstructing the ancient Nussach Eretz Yisrael, based on the Jerusalem Talmud and documents discovered in the Cairo Geniza and other sources. The reconstruction is published in the form of a siddur ("prayer book"), and used by Rabbi Bar-Hayim's Jerusalem followers in public prayers held in Machon Shilo's synagogue.

Other nuschaot
In addition, there are other nuschaot.
Nussach HaGR"A was a very brief version of Nussach Ashkenaz written by the Vilna Gaon, removing some passages which he believed had were not in the original prayer text, correcting some grammatical errors (according to him), and some additional small changes.
The Minhag Italiani and Minhag Benè Romì are used by some Italian Jews, as well as by a small number of minyanim in Jerusalem and Netanya.
Closely related to these was the "Romaniote" rite from  Greece where have lived an ancient, pre-Diaspora Jewish community.  The surviving Romaniote synagogues are in Ioannina, Chalkis, Athens, Tel Aviv, Jerusalem and New York. These now use a Sephardic rite but with Romaniote variations, selections of a few Romaniote piyyutim, combined with own melodies and customs and their special form of Byzantine-Jewish Cantillation.  There were formerly Romaniote synagogues in Istanbul. (The customs of Corfu are a blend between Romaniote, Apulian and Sephardic rites.)
There was once a French nusach, closely related to the Ashkenazi. The rite mostly died out after the expulsion of Jews from France in 1394, but certain usages survived on the High holidays only in the Appam community of Northwest Italy until shortly after WWII, and has since become extinct.
 In the Middle Ages, there was a unique Nusach Morocco, unrelated to Sephardic liturgy, this original minhag has not be practiced since shortly after the Expulsion of Jews from Spain, and it is unfortunately not well documented.
Distinct Persian and Provençal nuschaot also existed before being gradually replaced by the Edot Hamizrach and Spanish and Portuguese nuschaot respectively.
 Until the 16th century, the Aleppo community had its unique prayer rite. After Jews expelled from Spain arrived, they managed to convince the local community to adopt their practices, and the rite died out completely.
 The Jews of Catalonia had a Nusach distinct from the "standard" Spanish rite.  This rite was preserved partially until the 20th century.
 The Urfalim Jews of south eastern Anatolia follow their own prayer rite, which differs from the Syrian, Kurdish and Iraqi Jewish rites.

It is said among some mystics that an as-yet undisclosed nusach will be revealed after the coming of the Mashiach, the Jewish Messiah. Others say that the differences in nusach are derived from differences between the twelve tribes of Israel, and that in Messianic times each tribe will have its proper nusach. The concept of one nusach for each of the 12 tribes was formulated by R' Isaac Luria; at the time there were exactly 12 Jewish communities in Luria's city of Safed, and each community's nusach was meant to stand in place of that of one of the tribes.

Halakhot

Most halakhic authorities assume that one should follow the nusach of his family, or at the very least follow one nusach consistently. Rabbi David Bar-Hayim disputes this and permits a Jew to change his nusach at any time, even on a daily basis.

See also
Minhag
Siddur

References

External links
  A Historical Map of Jewish Liturgical Influence and Variation
  Western Ashkenazi Nusach
  Audio and text from the traditional Siddur SiddurAudio.com

 
Jewish music
Yiddish words and phrases
Yiddish words and phrases in Jewish law
Hebrew words and phrases in Jewish prayers and blessings
Hebrew words and phrases in Jewish law